Louise Caldwell Murdock (18571915) was an American interior designer / architect. Louise's father, J.E. Caldwell brought his family to Wichita from New York in 1871 and opened a Queensware (a hard, cream-colored earthenware, perfected c1765 by Wedgwood) store on North Main Street. She married Roland Pierpont Murdock in 1877 and founded the Twentieth Century Club with him in 1899 in Wichita. She served as its president until 1906. After her husband's death in 1906, she studied interior design with Frank Alvah Parsons in New York City, then returned to Wichita Kansas and designed and built the Caldwell Murdock building on East Douglas, which at seven floors became Wichita's tallest building.

References

Further reading
 
 
 
 
 

American women architects
American interior designers
1857 births
1915 deaths
American women interior designers